LGFA may refer to:
 Ladies' Gaelic Football Association, Ireland 
 Local government funding agency, financing mechanism for municipal projects etc.